Beyza County is in Fars province, Iran. The capital of the county is the city of Beyza. At the 2006 census, the region's population (as Beyza District of Sepidan County) was 36,694 in 8,565 households. The following census in 2011 counted 36,737 people in 10,257 households. At the 2016 census, the district's population was 39,883 in 11,535 households. Beyza District was separated from Sepidan County in 2018 to become Beyza County.

Administrative divisions

The population history of Beyza County's administrative divisions (as Beyza District of Sepidan County) over three consecutive censuses is shown in the following table.

References

 

Counties of Fars Province